Manlio Di Rosa (11 September 1914 – 15 March 1989) was an Italian fencer. He won two golds, two silvers and bronze at four different Olympic Games.

See also
Italy national fencing team - Multiple medallist

References

External links
 

1914 births
1989 deaths
Italian male fencers
Olympic fencers of Italy
Fencers at the 1936 Summer Olympics
Fencers at the 1948 Summer Olympics
Fencers at the 1952 Summer Olympics
Fencers at the 1956 Summer Olympics
Olympic gold medalists for Italy
Olympic silver medalists for Italy
Olympic bronze medalists for Italy
Sportspeople from Livorno
Olympic medalists in fencing
Medalists at the 1936 Summer Olympics
Medalists at the 1948 Summer Olympics
Medalists at the 1952 Summer Olympics
Medalists at the 1956 Summer Olympics